Stony Creek may refer to the following waterways or communities:

Waterways

Australia

 Stony Creek, a tributary of the Allyn River, in the Hunter region of New South Wales
 Stony Creek, a tributary of the Brogo River, in the South Coast region of New South Wales
 Stony Creek, a tributary of the Towamba River, in the South Coast region of New South Wales
Stony Creek, a tributary of the Stanley River, in the Moreton Bay Region of Queensland
 Stony Creek, a tributary of the Little River, in the Greater Geelong area of Victoria
 Stony Creek (Melbourne), a tributary of the Yarra River, in Melbourne, Victoria

Canada
Stony Creek (Lake Erie), a watershed administered by the Long Point Region Conservation Authority, that drains into Lake Erie
Stoney Creek (Lake Erie), a watershed administered by the Long Point Region Conservation Authority, that drains into Lake Erie

United States

 Stony Creek (Sacramento River tributary), California
 Stony Creek (Maryland), a tributary of the Patapsco River
 Stony Creek (Black River), flows into the Black River near Deer River, New York
 Stony Creek (Line Creek), converges with Line Creek by Middleburgh, New York
 Stony Creek (Mohawk River), a river that flows into the Mohawk River in Vischer Ferry, New York
 Stony Creek (West Canada Creek tributary), flows into West Canada Creek south of Middleville in Herkimer County, New York
 Stony Creek (Haw River tributary), a stream in Alamance and Caswell Counties, North Carolina
 Stony Creek (Mallard Creek tributary), a stream in Mecklenburg County, North Carolina
 Stony Creek, a tributary of the Schuylkill River, Pennsylvania
 Stony Creek (Black Creek tributary), Pennsylvania
 Stony Creek (Susquehanna River tributary), Pennsylvania
 Stonycreek River or Stoney Creek, a tributary of the Conemaugh River, Pennsylvania
 Stony Creek (Virginia), a river in Virginia
 Stony Creek (Clinch River), Virginia
 Little Stony Creek (North Fork Shenandoah River), Virginia, a tributary of the North Fork Shenandoah River
 Stony Creek (North Fork Shenandoah River), Virginia, a tributary of the North Fork Shenandoah River

Communities

Australia
 Stony Creek, Queensland, a rural locality in the Moreton Bay Region
 Stony Creek, Victoria, a township in South Gippsland

New Zealand
 Stony Creek, New Zealand, a locality in Clutha District

United States
 Stony Creek (Branford), a shorefront section of Branford, Connecticut
 Stony Creek, Indiana, an unincorporated community in LaGrange County
 Stony Creek, Michigan, an unincorporated community
 Stony Creek, Monroe County, Michigan, an unincorporated community
 Stony Creek, New York, a town in Warren County
 Stony Creek, Virginia, a town in Sussex County

See also
Stonycreek (disambiguation)
Stoney Creek (disambiguation)
Stone Creek (disambiguation)
 Stony Clove Creek, in the Catskill Mountains in New York
 Stony Fork Creek, a 4.1-mile-long (6.6 km) tributary of Babb Creek in Tioga County, Pennsylvania
 Stony Run Creek, in Yellow Medicine County, Minnesota